Uğurludağ District is a district of the Çorum Province of Turkey. Its seat is the town of Uğurludağ. Its area is 428 km2, and its population is 5,765 (2022).

Composition
There is one municipality in Uğurludağ District:
 Uğurludağ

There are 20 villages in Uğurludağ District:

 Ambarcı
 Aşılıarmut
 Belkavak
 Boztepe
 Büyükerikli
 Dağönü
 Eskiçeltek
 Gökçeağaç
 Karaevliya
 Karakısık
 Kırköy
 Kızağılı
 Köpeç
 Küçükerikli
 Resuloğlu
 Sazköy
 Torunlar
 Üçdam
 Yarımca
 Yeniyapan

References

Districts of Çorum Province